Absolute Loser is the seventh studio album by Fruit Bats, released on May 13, 2016, via Easy Sound Recording Company, a subsidiary of Welk Music Group.

Reception

Absolute Loser received generally favorable reviews from critics. At Metacritic, which assigns a normalized rating out of 100 to reviews from mainstream publications, the album received an average score of 75 based on six reviews.

Track listing

References

2016 albums
Fruit Bats (band) albums